In American vernacular architecture, a witch window (also known as a Vermont window, among other names) is a window (usually a double-hung sash window, occasionally a single-sided casement window) placed in the gable-end wall of a house and rotated approximately 1/8 of a turn (45 degrees) from the vertical, leaving it diagonal, with its long edge parallel to the roof slope. This technique allows a builder to fit a full-sized window into the long, narrow wall space between two adjacent roof lines.

Witch windows are found almost exclusively in or near the U.S. state of Vermont, generally in the central and northern parts of the state. They are principally installed in farmhouses from the 19th century, and can be found less frequently in new construction.

Etymology
The name "witch window" appears to come from a folk belief that witches cannot fly their broomsticks through the tilted windows, although it seems unlikely that the tale was taken seriously. The windows are also known as "coffin windows"; it is unclear if they really were used for removing a coffin from the second floor (avoiding a narrow staircase), or if the odd placement on the wall were reminiscent of a coffin. Either explanation seems far-fetched. The windows are also known as "Vermont windows" for their distribution and as "sideways" or "lazy windows" for their orientation.

Construction

Dormer windows are unusual in Vermont, particularly in older construction; windows are mostly placed in walls. When a house is expanded, for example with a kitchen wing or an attached shed, there may be very little wall space available in the gable end in which to put a window, which may be the only window available for an upper floor room (if there is no dormer—adding a dormer to an existing roof is problematic, as it involves puncturing the roof membrane).

The solution is to rotate the window until its long edge is parallel to the nearby roof line, to better maximize the space available for a window. Thus, not only is the window area (and thus incoming light and ventilation) maximized, but building or buying a custom window is avoided.

An alternative explanation for the orientation of the window is that getting at least one corner of a window up as far as possible in the interior of the house allows hot air (which rises to the top of the room) to escape on summer afternoons. However, this reasoning seems suspect, as Vermont is not as hot as many other locations, where the windows are not ubiquitous. If heat escape were the goal, diagonal windows could be placed in other walls as well.

The slanted orientation of the window can complicate the placement of the siding (such as clapboards) on the wall in which the window is hung, because if the siding is horizontal, it will meet the window frame at an acute angle, complicating both the cutting of the siding and the waterproofing of the frame-siding joint. One solution is to orient all of the siding on the wall so that it is parallel with the window frame.

In popular culture 
 On a Vermont Witch's Window Trail is a coffee table book about witch windows and their use in Vermont architecture.  The book is described as "[a] pictorial guide to a unique and whimsical feature of Vermont architecture."
 The Weird Window Brewing company, based in South Burlington, Vermont, was named for witch windows.  One of the windows is depicted in the brewery's logo.

See also 
 Witches' stones
 Fortochka
 Vernacular architecture

References

Further reading
 Herbert Wheaton Congdon, Old Vermont Houses: 1763-1850, 1940 (reprinted 1968, Noone House, Peterborough, N.H.).
 David G. De Long, Helen Searing, and Robert A.M. Stern, eds., American Architecture: Innovation and Tradition, Rizzoli, New York, 1986.
 Thomas C. Hubka, Big House, Little House, Back House, Barn: The Connected Farm Buildings of New England, University Press of New England, Hanover, N.H., 1984.
 Vermont Division for Historic Preservation, A Guide to Vermont Architecture, reprinted 1996, Montpelier, Vermont.

External links 
 Discussion of installing a Vermont window in an existing wall

Architectural elements
Windows
Vernacular architecture in Vermont
Superstitions of the United States
American witchcraft